The Pasur River is a river in southwestern Bangladesh and a distributary of the Ganges. It continues the Rupsa River. All its distributaries are tidal. It meets the Shibsa River within the Sundarbans, and near to the sea the river becomes the Kunga River. It is the deepest river in Bangladesh.

References

Rivers of Bangladesh
Distributaries of the Ganges
Sundarbans
Rivers of Khulna Division